Michail Elgin and Nikolaus Moser were the defending champions, but Moser decided not to participate.
As a result, Elgin partners up with Alexandre Kudryavtsev, but they withdrew prior to the tournament beginning.

Arnau Brugués-Davi and Malek Jaziri won the title, defeating Sergei Bubka and Adrián Menéndez 6–7(6–8), 6–2, [10–8] in the final.

Seeds

Draw

Draw

References
 Main Draw

Penza Cup,Doubles
2011,Doubles
2011 in Russian tennis